Pietro Martorana  (1705–1759) was a Sicilian painter. He was the father of Gioacchino Martorana and a member of an extended family of decorators and artists from Palermo.

Martorana was born, lived and died in Palermo, in the Mediterranean island of Sicily. He painted cycles of frescoes in the churches of San Carlo,  and Santa Rosalia, and in the Duomo. In 1736 he collaborated with Olivio Sozzi on frescoes in the Palazzo Butera.

References

1705 births
1759 deaths
18th-century Italian painters
Italian male painters
Painters from Palermo
18th-century Italian male artists